Luga is the name of several inhabited localities in Russia.

Urban localities
Luga, Leningrad Oblast, a town under the administrative jurisdiction of Luzhskoye Settlement Municipal Formation in Luzhsky District of Leningrad Oblast

Rural localities
Luga, Novgorod Oblast, a village in Bolshevisherskoye Settlement of Malovishersky District in Novgorod Oblast